Return to Space is an American documentary film made for Netflix and directed by Jimmy Chin and Elizabeth Chai Vasarhelyi. Its  story follows Elon Musk's and SpaceX engineers' two-decade mission to send NASA astronauts back to the International Space Station and revolutionize space travel. The film was released on April 7, 2022.

Synopsis 
The film tells a story of SpaceX from their Falcon 1 and re-usable Falcon 9 to the Crew Dragon Demo-2, launched on 30 May 2020 with Doug Hurley and Bob Behnken aboard.

Featuring 
 Elon Musk, founder of SpaceX
 Bob Behnken, astronaut
 Doug Hurley, astronaut
 Jim Bridenstine, head of NASA
 Tim Dodd of Everyday Astronaut
 Kiko Dontchev of SpaceX
 Lori Garver, Deputy Administrator of NASA
 Hans Koenigsmann, Chief Engineer of SpaceX
 Gwynne Shotwell, COO of SpaceX
 Lars Blackmore, Chief of Entry, Descent and Landing of SpaceX
 Karen Nyberg, astronaut and wife of Doug Hurley
 Megan McArthur, astronaut, member of SpaceX Crew-2 mission, wife of Bob Behnken
 Balachandar Ramamurthy of SpaceX
 Anna Menon of SpaceX

Reception 
The film received mixed reviews. IndieWire called it an "Exasperating 2-Hour Commercial for Elon Musk"; a Wired review, meanwhile, points that the film "chronicles the company’s unlikely rise, but it avoids talking about its shortcomings". The review by Decider was more favourable, saying: "While a large part of Return to Space plays like a SpaceX promotional video, the meaningful way the film tells the story of a group of hopeful dreamers makes it more than worth your while." The review by Joe Morgenstern on the Wall Street Journal was also favourable while noting the promotional tone, writing: "In fact, it promotes the company quite effectively, and why not? Elon Musk’s aerospace venture has achieved remarkable things since it was founded two decades ago. The film is more than that, though. It’s a return to dramatic accounts of blastoffs, followed by soul-filling footage from beyond our sheltering atmosphere and implacable gravity; a portrait, by reflected light from fiery boosters, of one of Earth’s most curious (in every respect) overachievers; and a testament to failing upward—far, far upward."

References

External links 
 
 
 Return to Space at Rotten Tomatoes

2022 documentary films
American documentary films
Elon Musk
Films about space programs
Netflix original documentary films
Films directed by Elizabeth Chai Vasarhelyi
Films directed by Jimmy Chin
Films scored by Mychael Danna
Films scored by Harry Gregson-Williams
2020s English-language films
2020s American films